Beware! is a 1919 American silent war drama film directed by William Nigh, and starring Maurine Powers, Regina Quinn, Leslie Ryecroft, and William Nigh. The film was released by Warner Bros. on June 1, 1919.

Plot
The American ambassador to Germany James W. Gerard warns that Germany will rise again to power and an attempt at world domination unless safeguards are taken,

Cast
Maurine Powers as Frederick the Great's Sweetheart
Regina Quinn as French Girl — Red Cross Nurse
Leslie Ryecroft as British Soldier
William Nigh as German Officer
Frank Norcross
Julia Hurley
Halbert Brown
Herbert Standing

Preservation
Prints of the film survives in the Library of Congress, Wisconsin Center for Film and Theater Research, and UCLA Film and Television Archive.

References

External links

1910s war drama films
American war drama films
1919 films
American silent feature films
American black-and-white films
Warner Bros. films
1919 drama films
Films directed by William Nigh
1910s American films
Silent American drama films
Silent war drama films
1910s English-language films